Arriba, juventud!  (English title: Youth has Arrived) is a 1971 Argentine musical film comedy about a musical group, directed and written by Leo Fleider and starring Roko and Rosanna Falasca. The film premièred on 4 March 1971 in Buenos Aires.

Cast
 Roko
 Palolo
 Rosanna Falasca
 Roberto Airaldi
 Mario Amaya
 Rodolfo Crespi
 Noemí del Castillo
 Eddie Pequenino
 Oscar Petri
 Fidel Pintos
 Vicente Rubino

External links
 

Argentine musical comedy films
1971 films
1970s Spanish-language films
1970s musical comedy films
1971 comedy films
1970s Argentine films
Films directed by Leo Fleider